The canton of Montbard is an administrative division of the Côte-d'Or department, eastern France. Its borders were modified at the French canton reorganisation which came into effect in March 2015. Its seat is in Montbard.

It consists of the following communes:
 
Alise-Sainte-Reine
Arrans
Asnières-en-Montagne
Athie
Benoisey
Boux-sous-Salmaise
Buffon
Bussy-le-Grand
Champ-d'Oiseau
Charencey
Corpoyer-la-Chapelle
Courcelles-lès-Montbard
Crépand
Darcey
Éringes
Étais
Fain-lès-Montbard
Fain-lès-Moutiers
Flavigny-sur-Ozerain
Fontaines-les-Sèches
Fresnes
Frôlois
Gissey-sous-Flavigny
Grésigny-Sainte-Reine
Grignon
Hauteroche
Jailly-les-Moulins
Lucenay-le-Duc
Marigny-le-Cahouët
Marmagne
Ménétreux-le-Pitois
Montbard
Montigny-Montfort
Moutiers-Saint-Jean
Mussy-la-Fosse
Nesle-et-Massoult
Nogent-lès-Montbard
Planay
Pouillenay
Quincerot
Quincy-le-Vicomte
La Roche-Vanneau
Rougemont
Saint-Germain-lès-Senailly
Saint-Rémy
Salmaise
Seigny
Senailly
Source-Seine
Thenissey
Touillon
Venarey-les-Laumes
Verdonnet
Verrey-sous-Salmaise
Villaines-les-Prévôtes
La Villeneuve-les-Convers
Viserny

References

Cantons of Côte-d'Or